Cameron "C.H." Miller (born 1980) is an American politician, media executive, political advisor, and former cosmetologist serving as a member of the Nevada Assembly from the 7th district. He assumed office on November 4, 2020.

Early life and education 
Miller was born in Las Vegas in 1980. He completed a cosmetology certificate program at the Southeast Career Technical Academy and earned a Bachelor of Arts degree in ministry leadership from Northwest University in 2019.

Career 
From 1998 to 2011, Miller worked as a licensed cosmetologist. In 2012, he became an operations manager and producer at Studio 11 Films in Las Vegas. In 2016 and 2017, Miller produced The Lillian McMorris Show, a local radio program. He has also worked as a freelance executive producer and media consultant.

Miller served as the Nevada political director of the Amy Klobuchar 2020 presidential campaign. He previously worked as the Nevada political director for the Beto O'Rourke 2020 presidential campaign. He was elected to the Nevada Assembly in November 2020, succeeding Dina Neal. His district includes West Las Vegas.

References 

Living people
1980 births
People from Las Vegas
Politicians from Las Vegas
Northwest University (United States) alumni
Democratic Party members of the Nevada Assembly
21st-century American politicians